Sungazing is the dangerous practice of looking directly into the Sun.  It is sometimes done as part of a spiritual or religious practice, most often near dawn or dusk. The human eye is very sensitive, and exposure to direct sunlight can lead to solar retinopathy, pterygium, cataracts, and often blindness. Studies have shown that even when viewing a solar eclipse the eye can still be exposed to harmful levels of ultraviolet radiation.

Movements
Referred to as sunning by William Horatio Bates as one of a series of exercises included in his Bates method, it became a popular form of alternative therapy in the early 20th century. His methods were widely debated at the time but ultimately discredited for lack of scientific rigor. The British Medical Journal reported in 1967 that "Bates (1920) advocated prolonged sun-gazing as the treatment of myopia, with disastrous results".

See also
 Inedia (breatharianism)
 Joseph Plateau
 Scientific skepticism

References

External links 
 San Diego State University Dept. of Astronomy information on solar observation safety

Natural environment based therapies
Alternative medicine
Sun
Eye injury
Eye diseases
Naturopathy